George Robertson (5 July 1825 – 23 March 1898) was a Scottish-Australian businessman as an early bookseller and publisher of Australian literature.

Robertson was born at Glasgow, Scotland. His parents moved to Dublin when he was four years old. He subsequently became apprenticed to a firm of publishers. He worked for a time with Currey and Company Booksellers in Scotland. In Dublin he had become friendly with Samuel Mullen and the two young men decided to emigrate to Australia.

They reached Melbourne on Great Britain in 1852, bringing with them a collection of books. Robertson opened first in Russell Street but soon moved to Collins Street, and around 1861 built a three-storey building at 69 Elizabeth Street. The business was developing fast, principally on the wholesale side. In those days there were no publishers' representatives in Australia, and the great problem for the bookseller was to forecast what would be popular, and order a sufficient number of copies to meet the demand.

Around 1873 large premises were built in Little Collins Street, with provision for stationery, book-binding, lithography, etc., and branches were opened in Sydney, Adelaide, Brisbane and Auckland. 
Commencing January 1875 he published the quarterly magazine Melbourne Review whose contents consisted chiefly of essays of quality and diversity. The issue of July 1885 may have been the last.
In 1891 a revival was announced, with Henry Giles Turner as editor, and again published by Robertson & Co., but it is not known if even one issue was printed.
In 1890 Robertson retired and the business was carried on by his son, Charles. It was eventually formed into a company which in 1922 was amalgamated with Melville and Mullens under the name of Robertson and Mullens Ltd.

He was married twice and had a large family. The need for encouraging local literature was not then fully appreciated, but Robertson published such books as Gordon's Sea Spray and Smoke Drift (1867), Kendall's Leaves from Australian Forests (1869),and James Brunton Stephens' The Black Gin and other Poems (1873).

References

Businesspeople from Glasgow
19th-century Australian businesspeople
Businesspeople from Melbourne
Australian people of Scottish descent
1825 births
1898 deaths
Australian booksellers
19th-century Scottish businesspeople